Calaphis is a genus of true bugs belonging to the family Aphididae.

The genus was first described by Walsh in 1862.

The species of this genus are found in Eurasia and Northern America.

Species:
 Calaphis betulicola
 Calaphis flava

References

Aphididae